Ismatullah, Esmatullah and Asmatullah are all spelling variants of the same Muslim male given name, formed from the elements Ismat and Allah. it may refer to
Asmatullah Rohani, Afghan judge
Esmatullah Muhabat (died 2005), Afghan politician
Ismatullah (Bagram detainee)
Ismatullah Muslim (died 1991), Afghan militia leader
Muhammad Hashim Esmatullahi, Afghan journalist

Arabic masculine given names